Tawlli Urqu (Quechua tawlli  a kind of legume, urqu mountain, "tawlli mountain", also spelled Taulli Orcco) is a mountain in the Andes of Peru, about  high. It is situated in the Ayacucho Region, Víctor Fajardo Province, Huamanquiquia District, southeast of Sarhua.

References

Mountains of Peru
Mountains of Ayacucho Region